Madagascar competed at the 1968 Summer Olympics in Mexico City, Mexico. Four competitors, all men, took part in six events in two sports.

Athletics

Jean-Louis Ravelomanantsoa
100 metres
First round: 10.2 s
Second round: 10.2 s
Semifinal: 10.2 s
Final: 10.2 s (→ 8th place)
200 metres — First round: 21.5 s (did not advance)

Fernand Tovondray
110 metre hurdles — First round: 14.9 s (did not advance)
High jump — Qualification: 2.03 m (did not advance)

Dominique Rakotarahalahy
Pole vault — did not start

Cycling

One cyclist represented Madagascar in 1968.

Individual road race
 Solo Razafinarivo

References

External links
Official Olympic Reports

Nations at the 1968 Summer Olympics
1968
Olympics